Radio Vitez or Radio postaja Vitez is a Bosnian local public radio station, broadcasting from Vitez, Bosnia and Herzegovina.

Radio Vitez was launched on 15 June 1992. Program is mainly produced in Croatian and Bosnian. This radio station broadcasts a variety of programs such as music, local news and talk shows.

Estimated number of potential listeners is around 42,144.

Frequencies
 Vitez

See also 
List of radio stations in Bosnia and Herzegovina
Radio Busovača

References

External links 
 www.radiovitez.ba
 Communications Regulatory Agency of Bosnia and Herzegovina

Vitez
Radio stations established in 1992
Vitez